The 1926 Iowa State Cyclones football team represented Iowa State College of Agricultural and Mechanic Arts (later renamed Iowa State University) in the Missouri Valley Conference during the 1926 college football season. In their first season under head coach C. Noel Workman, the Cyclones compiled a 4–3–1 record (3–3–1 against conference opponents), finished in seventh place in the conference, and were outscored by opponents by a combined total of 60 to 51. They played their home games at State Field in Ames, Iowa.

Roland "Bud" Coe was the team captain. No Iowa State players were selected as first-team all-conference players.

The October 2 contest in St. Louis against  was postponed to October 4 due to field conditions.

Schedule

References

Iowa State
Iowa State Cyclones football seasons
Iowa State Cyclones football